Formula Future Fiat was an open wheel racing series founded in 2010 by Felipe Massa and his family. It was based in Brazil. The champion received support to compete in Formula Abarth.

The category was founded in 2010 by Felipe Massa and his family. The series was organized in collaboration with the Confederação Brasileira de Automobilismo (CBA), RM Racing Events and Carlinhos Romagnolli Promoções e Eventos.

History

The great attraction of this category was the low cost, thus enabling the continuation of drivers coming out of karting to develop their skills driving formula racing  cars for when they arrive overseas in a luggage grade experience in next-generation cars.

The category has a great concern of the organization in its development, making the most of the driver season, where every driver has his box prepared by the organization, transportation of cars, mechanics, engineers, fuel, tires, maintenance, everything included in package accession to the rank of the drivers.

The car

The car was designed to comply with the Signatech-Fiat. The FPT engine have 150 hp and a top speed of more than 200 km/h. The transmission has five forward speeds with sequential shift mechanism. Pirelli is the single tyre supplier for the championship.

Regulation 

Drivers have four free patrice sessions of 30-minutes and 20-minutes. On Saturday drivers have a qualifying session. The qualifying session decides the grid order for Saturday's race.

On Sunday race, the grid is decided by the Saturday result with top 8 being reversed, so the driver who finished 8th on Saturday will start from pole position and the winner will start from 8th place.

Champions
All drivers were Brazilian-registered.

Circuits

The circuits for the 2011 season were:
 Autódromo José Carlos Pace (Interlagos), São Paulo, SP
 Autódromo Internacional de Curitiba, Pinhais, PR
 Velopark, Nova Santa Rita, RS
 Autódromo Internacional Ayrton Senna, Londrina, PR
 Autódromo Internacional Nelson Piquet, Brasília, DF

Former circuits in the Formula Future Fiat championship include:

 Autódromo Internacional Nelson Piquet (Jacarepaguá), Rio de Janeiro, RJ (last race: 2010)
 Autódromo Internacional de Santa Cruz do Sul, Santa Cruz do Sul, RS (last race: 2010)

References

Formula racing series
Auto racing series in Brazil
Recurring sporting events established in 2010
Recurring events disestablished in 2011
Defunct auto racing series
Motorsport competitions in Brazil